The Franco-Manitoban School Division (French: Division scolaire franco-manitobaine) is a school division in Manitoba, Canada offering French-language education to its students. The right to French education was gained through Section 23 of the Canadian Charter of Rights and Freedoms. The Division was formed in 1994, following court challenges that established the rights of minority-language groups in Canada to separate education systems.

23 Schools in the Division

Centre scolaire Léo-Rémillard (Grade: 9-12) Winnipeg
Collège Louis-Riel (Grade: 7-12) Winnipeg
École communautaire Aurèle-Lemoine (Grade: K-12) Saint-Laurent
 École Christine-Lespérance (Grade: K-8) Winnipeg
École/Collège régional Gabrielle-Roy (Grade: K-12) Île-des-Chênes
 École communautaire Gilbert-Rosset (Grade: K-12) Saint-Claude
 École Jours de Plaine (Grade: K-12) Laurier
 École La Source (Grade: K-9) Shilo
 École communautaire La Voie du Nord (Grade: K-8) Thompson
 École Lacerte (Grade: K-8) Winnipeg
 École Lagimodière (Grade: K-8) Lorette
 École Noël-Ritchot (Grade: K-8) Winnipeg
 École régional Notre-Dame (Grade: K-12) Notre-Dame-de-Lourdes
 École Pointe-des-Chênes (Grade: K-12) Sainte-Anne-des-Chênes
 École Précieux-Sang (Grade: K-8) Winnipeg
 École communautaire Réal-Bérard (Grade: K-12) Saint-Pierre-Jolys
 École Roméo-Dallaire (Grade: K-9) Winnipeg
 École Sainte-Agathe (Grade: K-9) Sainte-Agathe
 École communautaire Saint-Georges (Grade: K-12) Saint-Georges
 École régionale Saint-Jean-Baptiste (Grade: K-12) Saint-Jean-Baptiste
 École Saint-Joachim (Grade: K-12) La Broquerie
 École Saint-Lazare (Grade: K-12) Saint-Lazare
 École Taché (Grade: K-6) Winnipeg

Adult Education Centre
 Centre d'apprentissage franco-manitobain (CAFM)

See also

 List of school districts in Manitoba

External links
Division scolaire franco-manitobaine website

French-language school districts in Canada
School districts in Manitoba